Manor Green School is a day special school located in Maidenhead, Berkshire, England. It caters for over 200 students, aged 2–19, with a wide range of special educational needs (SEN).

History 
The school was previously known as Holyport Manor School, but was relaunched as Manor Green School in the summer of 2010, moving to a new purpose-built campus.

References

External links
 

Special schools in the Royal Borough of Windsor and Maidenhead
Maidenhead
Community schools in the Royal Borough of Windsor and Maidenhead